Alfons Alfred Zgrzebniok (also known by his codename Rakoczy; 16 August 1891 – 31 January 1937) was a Polish teacher, activist, and politician from Silesia. He commanded the Polish-Silesian forces in both the First and Second Silesian Uprising. He was the recipient of several awards and several schools and other landmarks in Poland are named after him. He has also been the subject of a number of poems and songs.

Biography

Alfons  Zgrzebniok was born on 16 August 1891 in Dziergowice (Dziergowitz). He attended a gymnasium in Raciborz (Ratibor). Later, in the early 1910s, he was a student at the University of Wrocław (Breslau), where he joined the Polish youth patriotic organization, the Association of the Polish Youth "Zet". After the start of World War I he was conscripted to the German Army. By the time the war ended, he was wounded thrice, and he was also promoted to the officer rank of lieutenant.

By late 1918 he joined the Polish Military Organisation (POW), and under  he organized local POW networks around Kędzierzyn-Koźle and Racibórz. He advanced through POW ranks, and by February 1919 he was considered one of its leaders in Silesia, and was part of the delegation that proposed an insurrection to the Polish Supreme People's Council in Poznań. In early July, the Council nominated Zgrzebniok to head the Polish Military Organization of Upper Silesia. He was the commander of the First Silesian Uprising (16–26 August 1919). In September he helped organize the Upper Silesian Militia (Milicja Górnośląska). On 27 May 1920 he was the commander of the defense of the Commission headquarters in Hotel Lomnitz during a surprise attack by German paramilitary forces. He commanded the Polish-Silesian forces during the Second Silesian Uprising (19–25 August 1920). After POW In Silesia was transformed into the Central of Physical Education (Centrala Wychowania Fizycznego), he became its vice president. He was one of the chief commanders of the Third Silesian Uprising (2 May – 21 July 1921). 

He was also promoted to the rank of a captain in the Polish Army. From 1923 he worked as a teacher in a high school in Chorzów; he also wrote a number of articles for the local press. That year he was married to Helena Woźniak. From 1927 he returned to the Polish Army, where until 1931 he was attached to the Polish Delegation to the Free City of Danzig. Near the end of his life, from 1934, he also held the position of the vice-voivode of the Białystok Voivodeship.

He died from a heart attack on 31 January 1937 in Marcinkowice, Nowy Sącz County. He was buried, as per his will, in the Rybnik Cemetery, which houses a section dedicated to the Silesian Insurgents. His funeral was a major event, and has been described as "attended by the entire Polish Silesia".

Awards
During his life he was the recipient of several awards, including:
Order of Polonia Restituta
Gold Cross of Merit
Cross of Valour
Cross of Independence with Swords
Virtuti Militari, 1st Class

Remembrance
Several schools and other landmarks in Poland, in particular, Silesia, have been named after him. He was a subject of several poems and songs. Plans to dedicate a plaque in his memory in the school in Chorzów he taught in, in the 1920s, were interrupted by World War II; eventually the plaque was erected in 1992 in that school, now the Zespół Szkół Technicznych Nr 2.

References

Further reading

1891 births
1937 deaths
People from Kędzierzyn-Koźle County
Silesian Uprisings participants
University of Breslau alumni
Polish schoolteachers
Polish politicians
Polish Army officers
German military officers
German Army personnel of World War I
Officers of the Order of Polonia Restituta
Recipients of the Gold Cross of Merit (Poland)
Recipients of the Cross of Valour (Poland)
Recipients of the Cross of Independence with Swords
Recipients of the Virtuti Militari